Bowlin may refer to:

Bowlin Stadium, a softball stadium in Lincoln, Nebraska
Bowlin, West Virginia
Mount Bowlin in the Queen Maud Mountains, Antarctica
Bowlin Travel Centers, a chain of roadside convenience stores in the United States

People with the name Bowlin
James B. Bowlin (1804–1874), American politician
Loy Allen Bowlin (1909–1995), American artist
Robert Bowlin (born 1956), American musician
Skyler Bowlin (born 1989), American basketball player
Weldon Bowlin (1940–2019), American baseball player